George David Challis (9 February 1891 – 15 July 1916) was an Australian rules footballer who played for Carlton in the Victorian Football League (VFL) during the early 1910s.

Family
The son of Michael Charles Challis (1865–1928), and Margaret Challis (1868–1943), née McGregor, George David Challis was born at Cleveland in the Northern Midlands of Tasmania on 9 February 1891.

He is the great-great-uncle of Levi Casboult.

Education
He attended Launceston Church Grammar School.

Football
Challis was a Tasmanian and started his career at Launceston, where he was a premiership player in 1909 and regular NTFA representative at the State Championships. He also represented Tasmania at the 1911 Adelaide Carnival, participating in their famous win over Western Australia. During this time he played mainly as a half forward or rover but when he was lured to Carlton in 1912 he soon established himself as a wingman. It was in that position that he starred in Carlton's 1915 premiership team.

He almost missed out on the chance to win a premiership as he had attempted to join the army at the beginning of the season, only to be refused because his toes overlapped.

Hall of Fame
The Tasmanian Football Hall of Fame was established in 2005; and among all of those who had played football in Tasmania over more than a century, Challis was one of the 130 former players chosen to be in the initial list of inductees.

Military service
A teacher by profession, and a committed Esperantist, he was eventually signed up and served with the 58th Infantry Battalion on the Western Front.

Death
Challis, by then a Sergeant, was killed in action, on 15 July 1916, when a heavy-calibre German artillery shell dropped into his trench in Armentières, France.

He is buried at the Rue-du-Bois Military Cemetery, in Pétillon, near Fleurbaix, in France.

See also
 List of Victorian Football League players who died in active service
 1911 Adelaide Carnival

Footnotes

References

 Holmesby, Russell and Main, Jim (2007). The Encyclopedia of AFL Footballers. 7th ed. Melbourne: Bas Publishing.
 Main, J. & Allen, D., "Challis, George", pp. 33–36 in Main, J. & Allen, D., Fallen – The Ultimate Heroes: Footballers Who Never Returned From War, Crown Content, (Melbourne), 2002. 
 McMullin, R., "Bluebloods Through the Ages", The Age, 24 August 2012.
 McMullin, R., "True Love, War, and Football", australianfootball.com.
 World War One Nominal Roll: Sergeant George David Challis (2595), Australian War Memorial.
 World War One Embarkation Roll: Sergeant George David Challis (2595), Australian War Memorial.
 World War One Allotment File: Sergeant George David Challis (2595), National Archives of Australia.
 World War One Service Record: Sergeant George David Challis (2595), National Archives of Australia.
 World War One Roll of Honour: Sergeant George David Challis (2595), Australian War Memorial.

External links
 
 
 Blueseum: George Challis
 Sergeant George David Challis (2595), Virtual War Memorial Australia.
 Launceston Church Grammar School WW1 Honour Board, Virtual War Memorial Australia.

1891 births
1916 deaths
People educated at Launceston Church Grammar School
Australian rules footballers from Tasmania
Carlton Football Club players
Carlton Football Club Premiership players
Launceston Football Club players
Tasmanian Football Hall of Fame inductees
Australian military personnel killed in World War I
Australian Esperantists
Burials at Rue-du-Bois Military Cemetery
One-time VFL/AFL Premiership players
Military personnel from Tasmania